The Gumti Water Fountain is a monument in Faisalabad, Pakistan preserved from the British Raj era. It was built during the early nineteenth century and was a general meeting place of the city folk for local town meetings.

Today the structure still exists and has been turned into a roundabout for traffic with the water fountain still working at the center.

References

External links 
Historical Gumti in Faisalabad on YouTube

See also
 Faisalabad
 Faisalabad International Airport
 Lahore
 Punjab (Pakistan)
 Pakistan

Faisalabad District
Buildings and structures in Faisalabad
Faisalabad
Tourist attractions in Faisalabad